During the 2000–01 season, Leeds United F.C. competed in the FA Premier League (known as the FA Carling Premiership for sponsorship reasons) and the UEFA Champions League, where they reached the semi-final.

Season summary
Having qualified for the Champions League in his first full season as manager, David O'Leary begun to spend big. French midfielder Olivier Dacourt was signed for a club record of £7 million along with striker Mark Viduka from Celtic and defender Dominic Matteo from Liverpool. Despite the outlay, Leeds were hampered with huge injury problems before the season had even begun. Despite starting the league campaign with back-to-back wins over Everton and Middlesbrough, it was soon clear that playing in the Champions League and Premiership with a young squad hampered with injuries was taking its toll. Leeds' form suffered at home, quickly falling out of any title race, although they did secure a memorable 4–3 victory over Liverpool in November with Viduka scoring all four goals. Europe, however, was a different story, although not initially. Leeds got a tough draw, going into the same group as Barcelona, AC Milan and Besiktas, and their campaign began with a 4–0 humbling by the Spaniards at the Camp Nou. However, memorable nights followed including a last minute winner from Lee Bowyer, after his shot slipped through goalkeeper Dida's hands at a rain-soaked Elland Road, and an impressive 6–0 victory over Besiktas, and Leeds had soon ensured progress to the second group stage against the odds.

In the run up to Christmas, O'Leary finally landed defender Rio Ferdinand from West Ham for a then world record fee of £18 million for a defender. Leeds lost their first UCL second group stage match at Real Madrid, but a win at Lazio gave the club hope of qualifying for the quarter finals. In the Premier League, however, Leeds' form was falling away. Successive losses to Aston Villa and Newcastle meant they were falling worryingly close to the relegation zone. Striker Robbie Keane was signed on loan from Inter Milan and this, combined with a 4–0 win over Manchester City, marked a turning point for Leeds. With key players including David Batty and Harry Kewell returning from injury, Leeds began charging up the table with Keane in great scoring form. Leeds' good form in Europe continued as home and away wins against Belgian side Anderlecht saw them qualify for the quarter finals, and after a 2–0 win over Sunderland Leeds were back in the top 3, following up with a crucial 2–1 victory against top-3 rivals Liverpool at Anfield.

Leeds were drawn against Spanish outfit Deportivo La Coruña, whose manager Javier Irureta, branded Leeds the competition's "weakest link". Their words came back to haunt them as Leeds won the first leg 3–0 at a raucous Elland Road, Ferdinand among the scorers with his first Leeds goal. The reverse leg in Spain finished 2–0, but Deportivo were unable to find a third on the night and Leeds, enjoying their first season at Europe's top table in nearly a decade, were in the semi-finals. Drawn against Valencia, their cup run eventually came to an end when, after a 0–0 draw at Elland Road, Leeds were beaten 3–0 in Spain. Domestically, Leeds were ending the season in good form but a 2–1 loss to Arsenal meant a 4th place finish and ensured, instead of having a second tilt at the Champions League, Leeds would be playing UEFA Cup football in 2001-02. Despite a disappointing finish Leeds had enjoyed one of the greatest seasons in their history, and the club and its fans were hopeful of a league title challenge the next year.

Leeds were knocked out of both domestic cups before February, going out to eventual winners Liverpool in the FA Cup and Tranmere Rovers in the League Cup.

Final league table

Results summary

Results by round

Results

Premier League

FA Cup

League Cup

UEFA Champions League

Qualifying

First group stage

Second group stage

Quarter-finals

Semi-finals

First-team squad
Squad at end of season

Left club during season

Reserve squad

Youth team

Appearances, goals and cards
(Starting appearances + substitute appearances)

Transfers

In

Out

Loaned in

Loaned out

References

Leeds United F.C. seasons
Leeds United
Foot